Guachené is a town and municipality in the Cauca Department, Colombia. The city was officially founded on December 16, 2006.

Sister Cities
 Prairie View, Texas, United States

References

External links
City of Guachené Official Website

Municipalities of Cauca Department